Lague Byiringiro (born 25 October 2000) is a Rwandan footballer who plays as a forward for Rwandan club APR and the Rwanda national team.

Club career
Byiringiro was promoted to the APR first team in the Rwanda Premier League (RPL) in January 2018, and played in the Heroes Cup later that month. He was nominated for Young Player of the Year at the 2018 RPL Awards after APR won its 17th title. They also won the Super Cup that offseason. Byiringiro was sidelined in March 2019 after he suffered a torn hamstring during a league fixture versus Sunrise FC. In May 2020 he was signed to a two-year contract extension. The 2019–20 Premier League season was abandoned due to the COVID-19 pandemic in Rwanda, and APR were awarded the league title by the Rwanda Football Federation.

He is set to attend trials with Swiss club FC Zürich in April 2021.

International career

Youth
Byiringiro represented the national under-20 team during 2019 Africa U-20 Cup of Nations qualification, scoring against Kenya in the first round. A few months later he played one game with the Rwanda U23s during 2019 Africa U-23 Cup of Nations qualification.

Senior
Byiringiro was first called up to the senior national team in March 2019 ahead of a Africa Cup of Nations qualifier against Ivory Coast, sitting on the bench during the 3–0 defeat. He was then called up by manager Vincent Mashami in October for a friendly against Tanzania, and again failed to make an appearance. In November 2020, he was named to the provisional squad ahead of a doubleheader of 2021 Africa Cup of Nations qualifiers against Cape Verde, but was left off the roster during final cuts.

Byiringiro made his senior international debut on 26 January 2021, replacing an injured Bertrand Iradukunda in the starting lineup of Rwanda's 3–2 group stage victory over Togo in the 2020 African Nations Championship. He played an instrumental role in the win that qualified them to the knockout stage, drawing praise for his ability to create chances through his dribbling, pace and vision. He also started in their quarter-final defeat to Guinea. Byiringiro scored his first international goal in his third match, an Africa Cup of Nations qualifier against Mozambique on 24 March 2021. After coming on for Thierry Manzi as a halftime substitute, he sent a right-footed shot from outside the penalty area past Mozambique goalkeeper Júlio Franque to secure the 1–0 victory.

Career statistics

International

International goals
Scores and results list Rwanda's goal tally first.

Honours

Club
APR
 Rwanda Premier League: 2017–18, 2019–20
 Super Cup: 2018
 Heroes Cup: 2019

References

External links
 
 
 

Living people
2000 births
Rwandan footballers
Rwanda international footballers
Rwanda under-20 international footballers
Association football forwards
APR F.C. players
Rwanda A' international footballers
2020 African Nations Championship players